Doris Kirchner (3 May 1930 – 26 March 2015) was an Austrian stage, film and television actress. Kirchner died in Ahrensburg, Germany on 26 March 2015, at the age of 84.

Selected filmography
 Fanfare of Marriage (1953)
 Arlette Conquers Paris (1953)
 I and You (1953)
 The Faithful Hussar (1954)
 The Seven Dresses of Katrin (1954)
 The False Adam (1955)
 My Leopold (1955)
 Yes, Yes, Love in Tyrol (1955)
 My Children and I (1955)
 Stopover in Orly (1955)
 The Hunter from Roteck (1956)
  (1956)
 Scandal in Bad Ischl (1957)
 The Forester's Daughter (1962)
 The Secret of the Black Widow (1963)
The Curse of the Yellow Snake (1963)
 When You're With Me (1970)
 When the Mad Aunts Arrive (1970)
 Aunt Trude from Buxtehude (1971)
 Rudi, Behave! (1971)

References

Bibliography
 Popa, Dorin. O.W. Fischer: seine Filme, sein Leben. Wilhelm Heyne, 1989.

External links

1930 births
2015 deaths
20th-century Austrian actresses
Actors from Graz
Austrian film actresses
Austrian television actresses